Cephalodina acangassu is a species of beetle in the family Cerambycidae. It was described by Martins and Galileo in 1993. It is known from Ecuador.

References

Hemilophini
Beetles described in 1993